Follett Johnson (April 20, 1843 – March 9, 1909) was a Union Army officer in the American Civil War who received the U.S. military's highest decoration, the Medal of Honor.

Johnson was born in Brasher, New York and was recruited to the army at Ogdensburg New York. Johnson was awarded the Medal of Honor for his actions at the Battle of New Hope Church on May 27, 1864.

His Medal of Honor was issued on April 6, 1892

Medal of Honor citation

References

External links

1843 births
1909 deaths
American Civil War recipients of the Medal of Honor
People from Massena, New York
People of New York (state) in the American Civil War
Union Army officers
United States Army Medal of Honor recipients